Blastobasis xiphiae is a moth in the family Blastobasidae. It is found in Costa Rica.

The length of the forewings is 4.5–5.2 mm. The forewings have pale-brown scales tipped with white intermixed with brown scales tipped with pale brown and a few dark-brown scales. The hindwings are translucent pale brown, gradually darkening towards the apex.

Etymology
The specific epithet is derived from Latin xiphias (meaning swordfish).

References

Moths described in 2013
Blastobasis
Moths of Central America